A sunfish (or mola) is any fish in the Mola genus (family Molidae). The fish develop their truncated, bullet-like shape because the back fin, with which they are born, never grows. Instead, it folds into itself as the creature matures, creating a rounded rudder called a clavus. Mola in Latin means "millstone" and describes the ocean sunfish's somewhat circular shape. They are a silvery color and have a rough skin texture.

Sharks and rays can be heavier, but they are cartilaginous fish.

Mola are found in temperate and tropical oceans around the world. They are frequently seen basking in the sun near the surface and are often mistaken for sharks when their huge dorsal fins emerge above the water. Their teeth are fused into a beak-like structure, and they are unable to fully close their relatively small mouths.

Ocean sunfish can become infested with skin parasites, so they will often invite small fish or even birds to feast on them.

They are clumsy swimmers, waggling their large dorsal and anal fins to move, and steering with their clavus. Their food of choice is jellyfish, though they will eat small fish and huge amounts of zooplankton and algae, as well. They are harmless to people, but can be very curious and will often approach divers.

Their population is considered vulnerable, as they frequently are snagged in drift gill nets and can suffocate on sea trash, like plastic bags (which resemble jellyfish, their main food source).

Species
There are currently 3 recognized species in this genus:
 Mola mola (Linnaeus, 1758) (Ocean sunfish)
 Mola alexandrini (Giglioli, 1883) (Southern sunfish)
 Mola tecta Nyegaard et al., 2017 (Hoodwinker sunfish)

References

 
Extant Miocene first appearances
Marine fish genera
Taxa named by Joseph Gottlieb Kölreuter